The 2010 season of the National League, the third tier of British speedway, was contested by ten teams. Buxton Hitmen beat Newport Hornets in the play-off final to become champions.

Final table
PL = Matches; W = Wins; D = Draws; L = Losses; BP = Bonus Pts Pts = Total Points

Mildenhall Fen Tigers withdrew - record expunged

Scoring system
 Home loss by any number of points = 0
Home draw = 1
Home win by between 1 and 6 points = 2
Home win by 7 points or more = 3
Away loss by 7 points or more = 0
Away loss by 6 points or less = 1
Away draw = 2
Away win by between 1 and 6 points = 3
Away win by 7 points or more = 4

Play Offs
Top four teams race off in two-legged semi-finals and final to decide championship.
The winner was Buxton Hitmen who defeated the Newport Hornets in the final.

Semi-finals

Final

National League Knockout Cup
The 2010 National League Knockout Cup was the 13th edition of the Knockout Cup for tier three teams. Buxton Hitmen were the winners.

First round

Quarter-finals

Semi-finals

Final

Teams and final averages

Bournemouth
Jay Herne 10.16
James Brundle 8.97
Mark Baseby 6.93
Kyle Howarth 6.61
James Sarjeant 3.91
Nick Lawrence 3.00
Danny Stoneman	3.00

Buxton
Craig Cook 10.64
Adam Allott 7.42
Nick Morris 6.90
Robert Branford 6.60
Jonathan Bethell 6.44
Jason Garrity 5.16
Lewis Dallaway 4.35

Dudley
Lee Smart 9.50
Barrie Evans 7.84
Micky Dyer 6.97
Jake Anderson 7.02
Tom Perry 6.56
Richard Franklin 5.39
Ashley Morris 5.25

Isle Of Wight
Paul Starke 8.06
Nick Simmons 8.05
Danny Warwick 7.41	
Lee Smethills 5.70	
Dean Felton 5.01	
John Resch	4.29	
Tom Hill 3.38
Danny Hodgson 3.00

King's Lynn
Simon Lambert 9.12
Darren Mallett	7.52
Adam Lowe 5.75	
Oliver Rayson 5.37	
Lewis Kerr 5.33	
Cal McDade	5.08		
Scott Campos 4.82		
Jake Knight 3.00

Newport
Todd Kurtz 9.01
Kyle Newman 8.18
Tony Atkin	7.78
Tim Webster 6.68
Luke Priest 6.08
James White Williams 4.96
Tom Young 4.62

Plymouth
Nicki Glanz 9.70
Mark Simmonds 8.96
Seemond Stephens 8.79
Matt Bates	4.47
Jaimie Pickard	4.35
Ross Walter 3.00
Ben Reade 3.00
Bob Charles 3.00

Rye House
Kyle Hughes 8.86
Marc Owen 6.92
Joe Jacobs	6.53
Lee Strudwick 6.29
David Mason 5.50
Ben Morley 4.65
Shane Hazelden	4.39
Tom Stokes	3.00

Scunthorpe
Mark Burrows 6.76			
Benji Compton 6.28		
Gary Irving 6.25			
Steve Worrall 5.74			
Scott Richardson 5.16			
Ashley Birks 4.92				
Adam Wrathall 4.31			
Luke Chessell 3.42

Weymouth
James Cockle 7.46				
Tom Brown 6.20				
Adam McKinna 6.15				
Karl Mason	5.85				
Brendan Johnson 4.31				
Gary Cottham 4.24				
Richard Andrews 3.00				
Luke Wiltshire	3.00

See also
 List of United Kingdom Speedway League Champions

References

2010
2010 in speedway
Speedway National League